Kaytazzade Mehmet Nazım (1857 – 1924) was one of the leading Turkish Cypriot poets of the nineteenth century.

Biography
Kaytazzade Mehmet Nazım was born in 1857 in Nicosia, Cyprus. In 1884, Nazım worked as an Ottoman official in the public service of the Ottoman Empire in Chios, Adana, Istanbul, Izmir, and Bursa. He then resigned from his duties and returned to his native Cyprus where he continued his profession in poetry.

References

 
 
 .

1857 births
1924 deaths
People from Nicosia
Turkish Cypriot poets
Turkish Cypriot writers
Divan poets from the Ottoman Empire